Boomerang is a French television channel which broadcast animated programs aimed at children. It is owned by Warner Bros. Discovery International under its EMEA and French divisions.

History 
In early 2000s, Boomerang was a morning and a Monday evening block on Cartoon Network France.

The channel was launched on 23 April 2003 in TPS and cable providers.

On 23 February 2010, Boomerang +1 was launched on SFR. It joined Orange in January 2013, then on Free and Bouygues Telecom in August 2014, and finally on Numericable on 14 April 2016.

In 2010-2011, Boomerang switched from classic programming to recent shows, taking away all cult licences from Cartoon Network (except Scooby-Doo! at the time). The channel took the slogan « la chaîne des personnages cultes du dessin animé », airing new shows such as Looney Tunes Show and The Garfield Show, and other shows for preschoolers.

Boomerang continued to carry classic shows (Looney Tunes, Tom and Jerry, The Pink Panther) on the Ça boom ! evening block. The block was completely pulled off on 3 July 2020.

Since September 2013, Boomerang broadcast in 16:9.

Boomerang was launched in HD on 1 July 2015.

Current Programming

American 
 Looney Tunes Cartoons
 Mr. Magoo
 Scooby-Doo and Guess Who?
 The Looney Tunes Show
 The Tom and Jerry Show
 Thomas & Friends: All Engines Go
 Tom and Jerry Tales
 Wabbit

Canadian 
 Kingdom Force
 Thomas & Friends: All Engines Go

French 
These shows are co-productions with France 3.
 Grizzy and the Lemmings
 Les Aventures du Petit Pingouin
 Taffy
 The Garfield Show

Acquired shows 
 Alice & Lewis
 Baby Boss: Back in Business
 Go Jetters
 Les Aventures du Petit Pingouin
 Moka's Fabulous Adventures!
 Mr. Bean
 Mr. Bean: The Animated Series
 True and the Rainbow Kingdom

Logos

References

External links
 

Boomerang (TV network)
Children's television networks
Television channels and stations established in 2003
2003 establishments in France
Television stations in France
French-language television stations
Turner Broadcasting System France